The 2013 London Marathon was the 33rd running of the annual marathon race in London, England, which took place on Sunday, 21 April. The men's elite race was won by Ethiopia's Tsegaye Kebede and the women's race was won by Kenyan Priscah Jeptoo. Australian Kurt Fearnley won the men's wheelchair race, while American Tatyana McFadden won the women's wheelchair race with a new course record of 1:46:02.

Around 167,449 people applied to enter the race: 48,323 had their applications accepted and 34,631 started the race. A total of 34202 runners, 22,136 men and 12,066 women, finished the race.

In the under-17 Mini Marathon, the 3-mile able-bodied and wheelchair events were won by Alex George (14:34), Bobby Clay (16:24), Will Smith (12:41) and Jade Jones (12:39).

Pre-race
After the Boston Marathon bombings six days before the London Marathon, organisers issued a statement announcing that the event's security—which is jointly planned with the Metropolitan Police—would be reviewed. On 16 April, Minister for Sport Hugh Robertson announced that the event would go ahead as planned, stating that he was "absolutely confident" that organisers can "keep the event safe and secure." Forty percent more police officers were deployed to manage the race than in 2012.

Race description

The 2013 London Marathon began with a 30-second moment of silence in honour of the victims of the Boston Marathon bombings. Many runners also wore black ribbons on the encouragement of race organisers. Organisers also pledged to donate US$3 to a fund for Boston Marathon victims for every person who finished the race. The weather was ideal for racing, drawing 700,000 fans and raising the prospect of a world record time.

Through the halfway mark of the men's race, the leaders were on world record pace. At that point, Great Britain's Mo Farah withdrew from the race, as he had planned. The pace dropped off after that and Emmanuel Mutai of Kenya built a large lead. In the final kilometre of the race, Tsegaye Kebede of Ethiopia surged past Mutai to win the men's marathon with a time of two hours, six minutes and four seconds. Ayele Abshero of Ethiopia finished third. 2012 Olympic champion Stephen Kiprotich of Uganda took sixth.

At the  mark, the women's elite leaders converged with men's wheelchair racers at a water station. Ethiopia's Tiki Gelana, who won the marathon at the 2012 Olympics in London, and Canadian wheelchair racer Josh Cassidy collided as she attempted to cut in front of him to get water. She returned to the race, but fell off the pace in clear pain. Priscah Jeptoo of Kenya pulled away from the lead group of three when she ran a 5-minute, 11-second 21st mile. She won the women's race with a time of two hours, 20 minutes and 15 seconds. "Today I'm very, very happy, I couldn't believe I could be the winner," Jeptoo remarked. Edna Kiplagat of Kenya and Yukiko Akaba of Japan finished second and third respectively.

In the men's wheelchair race, Kurt Fearnley of Australia won an eight-way sprint to the finish to win with a time of 1:31:29. He credited a new training regimen for his win and remarked "I realised last year that at the last  if someone's got that extra bit of power up their sleeve they beat you every time." Marcel Hug of Switzerland took second and Ernst van Dyk from South Africa finished third. Pre-race favourite and six-time winner David Weir of Great Britain finished fifth. Cassidy, who dropped out of the race after the crash, had harsh words for the race organisers. "I have a brand new $2,000 pair of wheels that are damaged, who's going to pay for them? Things have to change."

American Tatyana McFadden won the women's wheelchair race with a new course record of 1:46:02. Fellow American Amanda McGrory finished second and Sandra Graf of Switzerland took third.

Results

Men

Women

Wheelchair men

Wheelchair women

References

Results
Virgin London Marathon 2013 Tracking and Results. London Marathon. Retrieved 2012-05-22.
Men Results. Association of Road Racing Statisticians. Retrieved 2020-05-02.
Women Results. Association of Road Racing Statisticians. Retrieved 2020-05-02.

External links 

2013
Marathon
London
London Marathon